The Bachelor of Science in Law (BSL) is a somewhat special-purpose undergraduate degree that is typically intended for students who have completed some undergraduate education, but not received a baccalaureate degree, and are intending to resume their education and commence the study of law, ultimately towards a Juris Doctor degree, but need a bachelor's degree first.  Academic work at the start of a law program is sometimes combined with previous academic credit to form the basis of a BSL award.  The BSL degree is also sometimes intended for students who do not intend to attend law school, but are instead becoming paralegals or other legal assistants.

See also
 Juris Doctor

External links 
 Bachelor of Science in Law at Northwestern California University School of Law (NWCULaw®) 
 Bachelor of Science in Law at Southern California Institute of Law
 Bachelor of Science in Law at Larry H. Layton School of Law

Science in Law
Law degrees